Swing! is a musical conceived by Paul Kelly with music by various artists. It celebrates the music of the Swing era of jazz (1930s–1946), including many well-known tunes by artists like Duke Ellington, William "Count" Basie, Benny Goodman and others. It received a nomination for the 2000 Tony Award for Best Musical and other Tony awards.

Productions
Swing! premiered on Broadway at the St. James Theatre on December 9, 1999 and closed on January 14, 2001, running for 461 performances. The director and choreographer was Lynne Taylor-Corbett, and the production was supervised by Jerry Zaks. Among the cast were Laura Benanti, Ann Hampton Callaway and Everett Bradley. A US tour began Nov 20, 2000 at the Ahmanson Theatre in Los Angeles.

The Pittsburgh Civic Light Opera production, directed and choreographed by one of the original cast members, Dana Solimando, ran in June 2009.

The original cast album was released by Sony Classical on January 18, 2000.
The original cast album was nominated for a Grammy in the "Musical Show" category.

Premise
Swing! combines high energy dancing, singing and acrobatics.  There is no dialogue in the show, and the story is told entirely through music and dance. The show tries to recreate the swing style of jazz, which used large bands, fixed musical arrangements and solo-driven improvisations. Together with the development of the music, various forms of swing dancing emerged, varying by geographic regions, such as the Lindyhop or Jitterbug in Harlem or the Whip in Houston.<ref name=rnh>[http://www.rnh.com/show_detail.asp?id=SW2 Swing!] Rodgers and Hammerstein. Retrieved January 4, 2009</ref>

There are also story-driven numbers for example "I'll Be Seeing You", with Scott Fowler and Carol Bentley doing a Gene Kelly kind of ballet.

The show includes music and dance styles from early swing, West Coast, to other jazz styles, and even hip-hop (as shown as in an all-male version of "Boogie Woogie Bugle Boy"). Some of the individual couples, for example Ryan Francois and Jenny Thomas, perform their own choreography. Francois and Thomas are established stars in the world of swing, having been the Lindy champions in 1997 The American Swing Dance Championships and the U.S. Open Championships.Sommer, Elyse."A CurtainUp Review:Swing!" curtainup.com, February 3, 1999

Some of the songs have new lyrics, but most are well-known swing-era hits, including "It Don't Mean a Thing (If It Ain't Got That Swing)"; "Sing, Sing, Sing", "Jumpin at the Woodside"; and "Boogie Woogie Bugle Boy (of Company B)".

Songs

Act I
 "It Don't Mean a Thing (If It Ain't Got That Swing)" – Lyrics by Irving Mills, Music by Duke Ellington
 "Airmail Special" – Music by Benny Goodman, James R. Mundy and Charles Christian
 "Jersey Bounce" – Music by Duke Ellington, B. Feyhe, E. Johnson, T. Bradshaw and B. Plater
 "Opus One" – Music by Don George, Johnny Hodges and Harry James
 "Jumpin' at the Woodside" – Music by Count Basie
 "Bounce Me, Brother (with a Solid Four)" (from Buck Privates) – Music and Lyrics by Don Raye and Hughie Prince
 "Two and Four" – Music by Ann Hampton Callaway
 "Hit Me with a Hot Note and Watch Me Bounce" – Lyrics by Don George, Music by Duke Ellington
 "Rhythm" – Music by Casey MacGill
 "Throw That Girl Around" – Music and Lyrics by Everett Bradley, Ilene Reid and Michael Heitzman
 "Show Me What You Got" – Music by Jonathan Smith and Everett Bradley
 "Bli-Blip" (from Jump for Joy) – Lyrics by Sid Kuller, Music by Duke Ellington
 "Billy-A-Dick" – Paul Francis Webster and Additional lyrics by Seán Martin Hingston, Music by Hoagy Carmichael
 "Harlem Nocturne" – Music by Earle Hagen and Dick Rogers
 "Kitchen Mechanics' Night Out" – Music and Lyrics by Jonathan Smith, Paul Kelly, Lynne Taylor-Corbett and Casey MacGill
 "Shout and Feel It" – Music by Count Basie
 "Boogie Woogie Bugle Boy (of Company B)" (from Buck Privates) – Music and Lyrics by Don Raye and Hughie Prince
 "G.I. Jive" – Music and Lyrics by Johnny Mercer
 "A String of Pearls" – Lyrics by Eddie de Lange, Music by Jerry Gray
 "I Got a Gal in Kalamazoo" – Lyrics by Mack Gordon, Music by Harry Warren
 "Candy" – Music and Lyrics by Mack David, Joan Whitney and Alex J. Kramer
 "I'm Gonna Love You Tonight" – Lyrics by Jack Murphy, Music by Casey MacGill
 "I'll Be Seeing You" (from Right This Way) – Lyrics by Irving Kahal, Music by Sammy Fain
 "In the Mood" – Lyrics by Andy Razaf, Music by Joe Garland
 "Don't Sit Under the Apple Tree" – Music and Lyrics by Lew Brown, Sam H. Stept and Charlie Tobias

Act II
 "Swing! Brother, Swing!" – Music and Lyrics by Walter Bishop, Sr., Lewis Raymond and Clarence Williams
 "Caravan" – Lyrics by Irving Mills, Music by Juan Tizol and Duke Ellington
 "Dancers in Love" – Music by Duke Ellington
 "Cry Me a River" – Music and Lyrics by Arthur Hamilton
 "Blues in the Night" – Lyrics by Johnny Mercer, Music by Harold Arlen
 "Take Me Back To Tulsa/Stay A Little Longer" – Music by Bob Wills and Tommy Duncan
 "Boogie Woogie Country" – Music by Jack Murphy and Jonathan Smith
 "All of Me" – Lyrics by Seymour Simons, Music by Gerald Marks
 "I Won't Dance" (from Roberta'') – Dorothy Fields and Additional lyrics by Ann Hampton Callaway, Music by Jerome Kern
 "Bill's Bounce" – Music by Bill Elliott
 "Stompin' at the Savoy" – Additional lyrics by Ann Hampton Callaway and Andy Razaf, Music by Benny Goodman, Edgar Sampson and Chick Webb
 "Swing, Brother, Swing" (Reprise) – Music and Lyrics by Walter Bishop, Lewis Raymond and Clarence Williams
 "Sing, Sing, Sing" – Music and Lyrics by Louis Prima, Andy Razaf and Leon Berry
 "It Don't Mean a Thing (If It Ain't Got That Swing)" (Reprise) – Lyrics by Irving Mills, Music by Duke Ellington

Awards and nominations

Original Broadway production

References

External links
 
Swing study guide from TUTS
Swing song lyrics 

1999 musicals
Broadway musicals